The Tamperret, or "Tamper Court", was a special court in the Kingdom of Denmark which existed from 1542 to 1771. The Tamper Courts dealt with matters of marriage, including betrothals, infidelity, and children born outside of wedlock. The court would meet four times a year during the Ember days, which in Danish are known as tamperdag, hence the court's name.

Previously such cases had been dealt with by the Catholic Church, however responsibility for these cases was moved to the Temper Court following the Reformation. The courts themselves consisted of authorities from the state church and local government.  

Tamper courts were found in all parts of the Kingdom of Denmark, which during this period included Norway, Iceland, Greenland, the Faroe Islands, and colonies such as Tranquebar in India.

References

Legal history of Denmark
Legal history of Iceland
Legal history of Norway